Genoplesium insigne, commonly known as the dark midge orchid or Wyong midge orchid is a species of small terrestrial orchid that is endemic to New South Wales. It has a single thin leaf and up to twelve dark purple to dark reddish purple flowers. It is mostly found in heath on the Central Coast and only around fifty plants survive.

Description
Genoplesium insigne is a terrestrial, perennial, deciduous, herb with an underground tuber and a single thin, dark green leaf with a reddish base. There is a fleshy, dark purplish black callus in the centre of the labellum and covering less than half of it. Flowering occurs between August and November.<ref name="RBGS">{{cite web|last1=Jones|first1=David|title=Genoplesium insigne|url=http://plantnet.rbgsyd.nsw.gov.au/cgi-bin/NSWfl.pl?page=nswfl&lvl=sp&name=Genoplesium~insigne|publisher=Royal Botanic Garden Sydney|accessdate=3 February 2018}}</ref>

Taxonomy and namingGenoplesium insigne was first formally described in 2001 by David Jones who published the description in The Orchadian from a specimen collected in the Lake Macquarie State Recreation Area. In 2002, Jones and Mark Clements changed the name to Corunastylis insignis but the change is not accepted by the Australian Plant Census. The specific epithet (insigne) is a Latin word meaning "remarkable", "eminent" or "distinguished".

Distribution and habitat
The dark midge orchid grows in heath and heathy forest, in four small areas between Chain Valley Bay and Wyong with a further small population near Lake Macquarie.

Conservation
It is difficult to determine the precise number of plants of the G. insigne because they are difficult to locate and weather conditions affect whether or not the plants flower. There are estimated to be around fifty plants surviving. The species is classed as "Critically Endangered" under the New South Wales Threatened Species Conservation Act and the Commonwealth Government Environment Protection and Biodiversity Conservation Act 1999'' (EPBC) Act. The main threats to the species are weed invasion, habitat disturbance, grazing by rabbits and illegal collecting.

References

insigne
Endemic orchids of Australia
Orchids of New South Wales
Plants described in 2001